Fausto Daniel García Navarro (born 5 January 1956) is a Mexican boxer. He competed in the men's flyweight event at the 1984 Summer Olympics.

He began promoting professional fights in 2003 and was named director of the WBC Amateur Program in 2019.

References

1956 births
Living people
Mexican male boxers
Olympic boxers of Mexico
Boxers at the 1984 Summer Olympics
Place of birth missing (living people)
Flyweight boxers
Boxing promoters